Laura Bell may refer to:
 Laura Bell (courtesan) (1829–1894), famous courtesan of Victorian England
 Laura Anning Bell (1867–1950), British artist
 Laura Bell (author) (21st century), American author
 Laura Bell Bundy (born 1981), American actress
 Laura Joyce Bell (1854–1904), English-American actress
Laura Bell (drag queen), Chilean drag queen who competed on the first and second season of The Switch Drag Race

See also
 Laura Belli (born 1947), Italian actress and singer